Karl Golser (16 May 1943, Tscherms – 25 December 2016, Brixen) was the Roman Catholic bishop of the Roman Catholic Diocese of Bolzano-Brixen, Italy. Ordained to the priesthood in 1968, Golser was named bishop in 2008 and retired in 2011 due to health reasons. He died in 2016, aged 73.

References

1943 births
2016 deaths
21st-century Italian Roman Catholic bishops
Place of death missing
People from Tscherms